Al Qatraneh or Al Qatrana is a small town in Jordan. It is located 90 miles south of Amman. It belongs administratively to Karak Governorate.

History
The town is famous for its historic Qasr Al-Qatraneh, which was built in the Ottoman era as a waystation for pilgrims on their way to Hajj.

Geography

The town lies on the Desert Highway, in the desert plain east of the Mountains of Moab, on the borders between Karak and Amman Governorates.  The town is located on one of the tributaries of the Mujib River.

Demographics
In the census of 2004, the town had a population of 6,949.  The male to female ratio was 51% to 49%. Jordanian citizens made up 95% of the population. The estimated population in 2010 is about 8,300.

See also
Al-Qatraneh district
Qatrana Power Plant
Qasr al-Qatraneh, fortified khan (inn) along the hajj route

References

Populated places in Karak Governorate